Randolph Lycett and Max Woosnam defeated Arthur Lowe and James Cecil Parke in the final, 6–3, 6–0, 7–5 to win the gentlemen's doubles tennis title at the 1921 Wimbledon Championships. The reigning champions Chuck Garland and R. Norris Williams did not defend their title.

Draw

Finals

Top half

Section 1

Section 2

The nationality of Major Baden Powell is unknown.

Bottom half

Section 3

Section 4

The nationalities of AJ Hubert and C Goodall is unknown.

References

External links

Men's Doubles
Wimbledon Championship by year – Men's doubles